Dichagyris cyminopristes is a species of cutworm or dart moth in the family Noctuidae.

The MONA or Hodges number for Dichagyris cyminopristes is 10887.

References

Further reading

 
 
 

cyminopristes
Articles created by Qbugbot
Moths described in 1912
Moths of North America